Shahjahan Chowdhury is a Bangladesh Nationalist Party politician and a former Jatiya Sangsad member from the Cox's Bazar-4 constituency.

Career
Chowdhury was elected to parliament from Cox's Bazar-4 as a Bangladesh Nationalist Party candidate in 2001. Smuggling is a well known problem in the constituency, which encompasses Teknaf and Ukhia upazilas, both of which border Myanmar. Chowdhury is said to have been supported by "the man allegedly leading smuggling operations in Teknaf". He contested the seat again in 2018, but was defeated by Shahin Akhtar, the Awami League candidate. He is the president of the Cox's Bazar unit of the Bangladesh Nationalist Party.

References

Living people
Bangladesh Nationalist Party politicians
9th Jatiya Sangsad members
Place of birth missing (living people)
Date of birth missing (living people)
Year of birth missing (living people)